Rupert Scott Shipperley (born 21 November 1992) is a Welsh international field hockey player who plays as a midfielder or forward for Wales and Great Britain.

He plays club hockey in the Men's England Hockey League Premier Division for Hampstead & Westminster.

He has also played for Surbiton and Cardiff & Met.

Before being selected for Tokyo 2020, he was a Geography teacher at King's College School, Wimbledon.

International career
Shipperley made his senior debut for Wales on 13 May 2014, in a 0–5 defeat to Spain in Spain. He played for Wales at Hockey at the 2018 Commonwealth Games in Gold Coast and 2019 Men's EuroHockey Nations Championship, where they finished 6th.

References

External links

1992 births
Living people
Sportspeople from Cwmbran
Welsh male field hockey players
British male field hockey players
Male field hockey forwards
Male field hockey midfielders
Field hockey players at the 2018 Commonwealth Games
Surbiton Hockey Club players
Hampstead & Westminster Hockey Club players
Men's England Hockey League players
Commonwealth Games competitors for Wales
Field hockey players at the 2020 Summer Olympics
Olympic field hockey players of Great Britain
2023 Men's FIH Hockey World Cup players